The Declaration of Sexual Rights is a statement on sexual rights that was first proclaimed at the 13th World Congress of Sexology, run by the World Association for Sexual Health, in Valencia 1997. It was revised and expanded in 2014.

The 2014 version names 16 positions:

 The right to equality and non-discrimination
 The right to life, liberty, and security of the person
 The right to autonomy and bodily integrity
 The right to be free from torture and cruel, inhuman, or degrading treatment or punishment
 The right to be free from all forms of violence and coercion
 The right to privacy
 The right to the highest attainable standard of health, including sexual health; with the possibility of pleasurable, satisfying, and safe sexual experiences
 The right to enjoy the benefits of scientific progress and its application
 The right to information
 The right to education and the right to comprehensive sexuality education
 The right to enter, form, and dissolve marriage and similar types of relationships based on equality and full and free consent
 The right to decide whether to have children, the number and spacing of children, and to have the information and the means to do so
 The right to the freedom of thought, opinion, and expression
 The right to freedom of association and peaceful assembly
 The right to participation in public and political life
 The right to access to justice, remedies, and redress

External links 
 Declaration of Sexual Rights (2014)

References 

Sex and the law